The Savio is a river in the Emilia-Romagna region of northern Italy. Its source is in the province of Forlì-Cesena near Montecoronaro on Mount Castelvecchio which is near the western side of Mount Fumaiolo. A wolf (the symbol of Montecoronaro) and the rings of the "caveja" (the symbol of Romagna) are on this monument. The river flows near Verghereto and Bagno di Romagna as it winds through the mountains before entering Lago di Quarto. After leaving the lake, the river flows northeast near Sarsina (near the border with the province of Pesaro and Urbino) and Mercato Saraceno before flowing north. The river winds for  along the valley. Its natural track has been preserved relatively well and, in the territory of Cesena, it shows an environment which is one of the purest of the whole Romagna. North of Cesena, the river crossed the border into the province of Ravenna. After a total course of  the river enters the Adriatic Sea north of Cervia by Lido di Classe and Lido di Savio.

The park contains many species of animals and plants. The trees divide the area in two belts: the one near the waters contains white willows with black and white poplars; the second presents locust-trees.

Although the park is relatively small, many animals are visible here, both birds (herons, king-fishers, woodpeckers and raptors) and mammals (hares, porcupines, foxes, and roe deer).

See also
Savio River Reserve

References

Nature reserves in Italy
Rivers of the Province of Forlì-Cesena
Rivers of the Province of Ravenna
Rivers of the Apennines
Rivers of Italy
Adriatic Italian coast basins